Kamil Ocak Sport Hall is an indoor multi-purpose sport venue that is located in Gaziantep, Turkey. Opened in 1969, the hall has a seating capacity of 2,500 spectators. It is home to Royal Halı Gaziantep, which plays currently in the Turkish Basketball League.

References

Sports venues completed in 1969
Indoor arenas in Turkey
Basketball venues in Turkey
Turkish Basketball League venues